Thomas Campbell Webster (December 25, 1910 – January 31, 1981) was an American sailor who competed in the 1932 Summer Olympics.

In 1932 he was a crew member of the American boat Angelita which won the gold medal in the 8 metre class.

References

External links
 
 
 

1910 births
1981 deaths
American male sailors (sport)
Olympic gold medalists for the United States in sailing
Sailors at the 1932 Summer Olympics – 8 Metre
Medalists at the 1932 Summer Olympics